Baegyang-ri Station is a railway station of the Gyeongchun Line in Namsan-myeon, Chuncheon-si, Gangwon-do, South Korea. Its station subname is Elysian Gangchon where the entrance to Elysian Gangchon is nearby and is located at the Bukhan River.

Services
During the winter ski season, ITX-Cheongchun runs that can board at Yongsan, Wangsimni, and Cheongnyangni every weekend, However, if ITX-Cheongchun stops at this station, go directly to Namchuncheon Station without stopping at Gangchon Station.

Station Layout

Gallery

External links
 

Metro stations in Chuncheon
Seoul Metropolitan Subway stations
Railway stations opened in 1939